The 1952 Oregon Webfoots football team represented the University of Oregon as a member of the Pacific Coast Conference (PCC) during the 1952 college football season. In their second season under head coach Len Casanova, the Webfoots compiled a 2–7–1 record (2–5 against PCC opponents), finished in a tie for sixth place in the PCC, and were outscored by their opponents, 234 to 112. The team played home games at Hayward Field in Eugene, Oregon.

Schedule

References

Oregon
Oregon Ducks football seasons
Oregon Webfoots football